Santa María is a title of Mary, mother of Jesus, in languages such as Italian, Portuguese and Spanish.

Santa Maria or Santa María may also refer to:

Arts and entertainment

Music 
 "Santa Maria" (Tatjana song), released 1995 
 "Santa Maria" (Kenshi Yonezu song), released 2013
 "Santa Maria", 1976 song by Canadian rock band Trooper
 "Santa Maria", 1980 song by Guido & Maurizio De Angelis, a.k.a. Oliver Onions
 "Santa Maria", 1999 song by German band In Extremo
 "Santa Maria", 2001 song by Gotan Project
 "Santa Maria", 2001 song by The Frames
 "Santa María", a 2019 song by Bad Gyal featuring Busy Signal

Other media
 Santa Maria (operetta) by Oscar Hammerstein I
 Santa Maria, early title of the 2017 film Richie

Churches

Italy

Florence
 Florence Cathedral or Basilica di Santa Maria del Fiore
 Santa Maria degli Angeli, Florence
 Santa Maria dei Candeli
 Santa Maria del Carmine, Florence
 Santa Maria Novella, basilica

Rome
 Basilica di Santa Maria Maggiore
 Basilica of Santa Maria del Popolo
 Basilica of Santa Maria in Ara Coeli
 Santa Francesca Romana, Rome, or Santa Maria Nova
 Santa Maria dei Miracoli and Santa Maria in Montesanto
 Santa Maria della Consolazione
 Santa Maria della Pace
 Santa Maria della Pietà in Camposanto dei Teutonici
 Santa Maria di Loreto, Rome
 Santa Maria in Cosmedin
 Santa Maria in Trastevere
 Santa Maria in Via Lata
 Santa Maria Maddalena
 Santa Maria sopra Minerva

Venice
 Abbazia della Misericordia or Santa Maria dell'Abbazia della Misericordia
 Gesuati, or Santa Maria del Rosario
 Santa Maria dei Miracoli, Venice
 Santa Maria della Salute
 Santa Maria Formosa
 Santa Maria Gloriosa dei Frari, Basilica
 Santa Maria Zobenigo or Santa Maria del Giglio

Other places in Italy

 Santa Maria del Regno, Ardara
 Santa Maria Maggiore, Bergamo
 Church of Santa Maria Assunta (Esine)
 Sant'Angelo (Milan) or Santa Maria degli Angeli
 Santa Maria presso San Satiro, Milan
 Santa Maria di Montedoro, Montefiascone
 Santa Maria in Strada, Monza
 Santa Maria degli Angeli, Murano
 Santa Maria e San Donato, Murano
 Santa Donna Regina Nuova or Santa Maria Donna Regina Nuova, Naples
 Santa Maria della Catena, Naples
 Santa Maria di Costantinopoli, Naples
 Santa Maria Donna Regina Vecchia, Naples
 Martorana or Church of Santa Maria dell'Ammiraglio, Palermo
 Santa Maria del Carmine, Pavia
 Santa Maria di Canepanova, Pavia
 Santa Maria della Catena, Palermo
 Santa Maria della Spina, Pisa
 Santa Maria delle Carceri, Prato
 Santa Maria in Organo, Verona

Portugal
 Church of Santa Maria do Olival, a church in Tomar
 Jerónimos Monastery#Church of Santa Maria, a church in Lisbon

Spain

Asturias
 Church of Santa María de Celón
 Church of Santa María de Junco
 Santa María de la Corte
 Church of Santa María de Llas
 Church of Santa María de Sabada
 Church of Santa María de Sariegomuerto
 Church of Santa María de Villanueva

Other places in Spain
 Church of Santa María de Bendones
 Colegiata de Santa María la Mayor (Toro)
 Santa María de Melque, Toledo
 Santa María del Naranco, Oviedo

United States
 Iglesia San Isidro Labrador y Santa María de la Cabeza, Sabana Grande, Puerto Rico

People
 Antonia Santa María (born 1982), Chilean actress
 Cara Santa Maria (born 1983), American science educator and blogger
 Domingo Santa María (1825–1889), Chilean president

Places

Argentina
 Santa María, Catamarca
 Santa María Department (disambiguation), two departments in Argentina
 Santa María de Punilla
 Santa María (Misiones)
 Santa María (Salta)
 Santa María del Buen Ayre, old name of Buenos Aires

Brazil
 Santa Maria, Federal District
 Santa Maria, Rio Grande do Norte
 Santa Maria, Rio Grande do Sul
 Santa Maria das Barreiras, Pará
 Santa Maria da Boa Vista, Pernambuco
 Santa Maria do Cambucá, Pernambuco
 Santa Maria do Herval, Rio Grande do Sul
 Santa Maria de Itabira, Minas Gerais
 Santa Maria de Jetibá, Espírito Santo 
 Santa Maria Madalena, Rio de Janeiro
 Santa Maria do Oeste, Paraná
 Santa Maria do Pará, Pará
 Santa Maria do Salto, Minas Gerais
 Santa Maria da Serra, São Paulo
 Santa Maria do Suaçuí, Minas Gerais 
 Santa Maria do Tocantins, Tocantins
 Santa Maria da Vitória, Bahia

Cape Verde
 Santa Maria, Cape Verde

Chile
 Santa María, Chile

Colombia
 Santa María, Huila
 Santa María, Boyacá

El Salvador
 Santa María, Usulután

Guatemala
 Santa María Cahabón
 Santa María Chiquimula
 Santa María de Jesús
 Santa María Ixhuatán
 Santa María Visitación
 Santa María (volcano)

Italy
 Santa Maria Nuova, Marche, a comune in Marche
 Santa Maria di Castellabate, a town in Campania

Malta
 Tigné Point, originally known as Punta di Santa Maria

Mexico
 Misión Santa María de los Ángeles, Baja California
 Santa María de los Ángeles, Jalisco
 Santa María del Oro, Durango
 Santa María del Oro, Nayarit
 Santa María del Río, San Luis Potosí
 Santa María, Oaxaca (disambiguation), several places

Panama
 Santa María District, Panama
 Santa María, Herrera

Paraguay
 Santa María, Paraguay, a city and district

Peru
 Santa María District, Huaura, a district in Huaura province
 Santa María del Mar (Peru), a district in Lima province

Philippines
 Santa Maria, Bulacan, a first-class urban municipality in the province of Bulacan
 Santa Maria, Davao Occidental
 Santa Maria, Ilocos Sur
 Santa Maria, Isabela
 Santa Maria, Laguna
 Santa Maria, Pangasinan
 Santa Maria, Romblon

Portugal
 Santa Maria (Tavira), a civil parish in the municipality of Tavira
 Sé, Santa Maria e Meixedo, a civil parish in the municipality of Bragança
 Cabo de Santa Maria (Faro), a cape south of Faro; the southernmost point of mainland Portugal
 Santa Maria Island, in the eastern group of the Azores

Romania
 Sântă Măria, a river in Sălaj County
 Sântă Măria, a village in the commune Sânmihaiu Almașului, Sălaj County

Spain

Barcelona
 Santa Maria de Besora, Osona 
 L'Esquirol, Osona, known as Santa Maria de Corcó until 2014
 Santa Maria de Martorelles 
 Santa Maria de Merlès 
 Santa Maria de Miralles
 Santa Maria de Palautordera
 Santa Maria del Mar, Barcelona
 Santa Maria d'Oló

Burgos
 Santa María del Campo
 Santa María del Invierno
 Santa María del Mercadillo
 Santa María Ribarredonda

Other places in Spain
 El Pla de Santa Maria, Tarragona
 El Puerto de Santa María, Cádiz
 Santa María de Guía de Gran Canaria, Canary Islands
 Santa María de Sando, Salamanca
 Santa María del Páramo, León
 Santa María La Antigua, Valladolid

Switzerland
 Santa Maria in Calanca
 Santa Maria Val Müstair

United States
 Santa Maria, California
 Santa Maria, Texas
 Santa Maria Estate, U.S. Virgin Islands
 Santa Maria Valley AVA, California wine region

Vanuatu
 Gaua, formerly known as Santa Maria Island

Transport
 Santa María (ship), used by Christopher Columbus
 Spanish frigate Santa María
 Santa María (Mexibús), a BRT station in Tultitlán, Mexico
 Santa Maria, a cruise liner hijacked in 1961
 AL-60B-1 Santa Maria, variant of the Aermacchi AL-60

Other uses
 Santa Maria (building), a skyscraper in Miami, Florida, United States
 Santa Maria (crater), on Mars

See also
 List of churches consecrated to Santa Maria Assunta
 Maria Maddalena (disambiguation)
 Marie-Madeleine (disambiguation)
 Maria Magdalena (disambiguation)
 Mary Magdalene (disambiguation)
 Santa Maria Airport (disambiguation)
 Santa Maria Island (disambiguation)
 Santa María la Real (disambiguation)
 Santa Maria River (disambiguation)
 Santamaria (disambiguation)